In taxonomy, Ignisphaera is a genus of the Desulfurococcales. Ignisphaera aggregans is a coccoid- shaped, fourth type strain that is strictly anaerobes with anaerobic respiration. This archaea species are hyperthermophiles that were found in New Zealand's hot springs in Kuirau Park, Rotorua.

References

Further reading

Scientific journals

Scientific books

Scientific databases

External links

Archaea genera
Thermoproteota